Wyrmwood: Apocalypse is a 2021 Australian action-horror film directed by Kiah Roache-Turner and starring Luke McKenzie, Shantae Barnes-Cowan, Jake Ryan, Bianca Bradey and Jay Gallagher. It is a sequel to 2014's Wyrmwood.

Cast
Jay Gallagher as Barry
Bianca Bradey as Brooke
Luke McKenzie as Rhys
Shantae Barnes-Cowan as Maxi
Jake Ryan as The Colonel
Tasia Zalar as Grace
Nicholas Boshier as The Surgeon General
David Collins as Keith Head Boom (uncredited)

Reception

The film review website Metacritic surveyed  and assessed 5 reviews as positive, 3 as mixed, and 1 as negative. It gave an weighed average score of 62 out of 100, which it said indicated "Generally favorable reviews".
Rotten Tomatoes lists  with 20 assessed as fresh and 3 as rotten. It gave the film a score of 87%.

Lena Wilson of the New York Times gave it a positive review writing "“Wyrmwood: Apocalypse” is a must-see for zombie fans, thanks to a quick-witted script by the director, Kiah Roache-Turner, and his brother, Tristan Roache-Turner. Writing in The Los Angeles Times  wrote "“Apocalypse” is equal parts exhausting and impressive — though thanks to the giddy fun the filmmakers appear to be having, it's mostly the latter." The Guardian's Luke Buckmaster gave it 3 stars saying "The film is a perversely colourful, visually energetic and proudly splatterific sequel to its 2015 predecessor, a lean and mean midnight movie that, while stuffed with familiar genre elements, had a couple of rare or rare-ish distinguishing features." The Weekend Australian's Stephen Romei gave it 3 1/2 stars writing "The result ia an outlandish, humorous and entertaining schlocker that nods to Mad Max, Peter jackson's 1987 debut Bad Taste and, even earlier, Soylent Green, starring Charlton Heston, from 1973."

References

External links
 

2021 films
2021 horror films
Australian zombie films
Australian action adventure films
Australian comedy horror films
Films about viral outbreaks
Australian action horror films
Australian science fiction horror films
Australian science fiction action films
Australian post-apocalyptic films
Australian splatter films
2020s English-language films